White-tailed greenbul may refer to:

 Honeyguide greenbul, a species of bird found in western and central Africa
 Sjöstedt's greenbul, a species of bird found in western and central Africa
 Swamp palm bulbul, a species of bird found in western and central Africa

Birds by common name